Francisco Menéndez Valdivieso (3 December 1830 – 22 June 1890) was Provisional President of El Salvador from 22 June 1885 to 1 March 1887, then President of El Salvador from 1 March 1887 until his death on 22 June 1890.

General Francisco Menéndez was born in Ahuachapán, 3 December 1830 and died in San Salvador, 22 June 1890. His parents were José Eustachian Menéndez and Gabriela Valdivieso, independently wealthy landowners. In 1858, General Menéndez wed Bonifacia Salazar in an arranged marriage. At age forty-one he took an active role in the revolution of 1871 that ousted Dr. Francisco Dueñas, the mayor of Ahuachapán. At the age of fifty-five General Menéndez was named Provisional President of El Salvador 22 June 1885, receiving the supreme power of José Rosales.

Menéndez presided over the creation of the liberal Constitution of 1886, which served as El Salvador's constitution well into the 20th century. He was elected to a constitutional four-year term in 1887 and would be overthrown in a coup d'état in 1890. His son José Asensio Menéndez and grandson Enrique Magaña Menéndez were active in politics in the 20th century.

References 

1830 births
1890 deaths
People from Ahuachapán
People of Asturian descent
Presidents of El Salvador
Salvadoran military personnel
Leaders who took power by coup
Leaders ousted by a coup
19th-century Salvadoran people